"Not Alone" is a song written and recorded by American rock band Linkin Park from the compilation album, Download to Donate for Haiti. It is the twenty-first single by the band, and was released on October 21, 2011. The song is the opening track on the album. In addition to the single, a music video was released on January 19, 2010.

Background
It is said by Mike Shinoda that the electronic elements in the band's fourth studio album has its roots from this song. Shinoda and Rick Rubin together released the single. This is the one and the only single from the compilation album. The song was also included in the album Download to Donate for Haiti V2.0 as a track which is a sequel for the compilation album. Following the 2011 Tohoku earthquake and tsunami, the band also included an instrumental song "Issho Ni" in the third sequel of the album, Download to Donate: Tsunami Relief.

Commercial performance
The song has over 115,000 downloads as the release of the single. The same figures of progress was shown by the album. The single is the least successful single by the band, whereas it is the fourth most successful promotional single by the band after the song "A Light That Never Comes" with American electronic musician Steve Aoki that's also a single, "Lying from You" and "Powerless" as promotional singles. The song has raised over $148,350 for the Haiti earthquake.

Music video
The music video of the song was released on February 18, 2010 on YouTube, iTunes and Myspace. The video was directed by Bill Boyd. The video is a footage type music video. It contains footage of the tragedy and crisis took place in Haiti after the earthquake. It also contains an advertisement for the compilation album at the end of the video.

The video shows how people from Haiti survived in an earthquake crisis, with dozens of people injured during the crisis, many people dead during and after the crisis, and how they grew upset after the crisis, and people getting free stuff from other people who came from the United States of America, before serving up food for the people of Haiti, etc. During the video, it shows Linkin Park recording and composing on the song for the compilation album as the band's single: Chester Bennington recording the vocals, Mike Shinoda and Brad Delson composing the song while in recording session with the rest of the band, Rob Bourdon working on the drums, Dave "Phoenix" Farrell on the bass guitars, and Joe Hahn on the synthesizer.

As of January 2021, the song has 22 million views on YouTube.

Track listing
All the songs composed and written by Linkin Park.

Personnel 
 Chester Bennington – lead vocals
 Rob Bourdon – drums, percussion
 Brad Delson – guitars
 Dave "Phoenix" Farrell – bass guitars
 Joe Hahn – samplers, turntables
 Mike Shinoda – backing vocals, keyboards

Release history

References

Linkin Park songs
2010 songs
2011 singles
Songs written by Mike Shinoda
Warner Records singles